Double Live Gonzo! is a live album by the American hard rock guitarist Ted Nugent, released as a double LP in 1978. In addition to live versions of songs from previous albums, this double album also contains original material played live, including: "Yank Me, Crank Me" and "Gonzo". The album has reached 3× Platinum status in the United States.

Track listing

Personnel
Band members
 Derek St. Holmes – rhythm guitar, lead and backing vocals
 Ted Nugent – lead guitar, backing and lead vocals, arrangements
 Rob Grange – bass
 Cliff Davies – drums, backing vocals

Production
 Lew Futterman, Tom Werman – producers
 Ric Browde – assistant to the producers
 Tim Geelan – engineer, mixing at CBS Studios, New York
 Don Puluse – engineer
 Chet Himes, Malcom Harper, Alex Kazanegas, Tom Arrison, Bob Dickson, Perry Cheatham – remote recorders personnel
 Gerard Huerta – lettering
 David Gahr – photography
 John Berg, Paula Scher – design
 Mark Wilder – digital remastering

Charts

Album

Singles

Certifications

References

Ted Nugent albums
1978 live albums
Epic Records live albums
Albums produced by Tom Werman